This is a list of Italian comedians sorted by last name:

Diego Abatantuono
Antonio Albanese 
Aldo, Giovanni & Giacomo 
Lello Arena 
Giorgio Ariani 
Dario Bandiera 
Lino Banfi 
Roberto Benigni
Enrico Beruschi 
Riccardo Billi 
Claudio Bisio 
Massimo Boldi 
Bombolo 
Franco Bracardi 
Giorgio Bracardi 
Gino Bramieri 
Enrico Brignano 
Fred Buscaglione
Lando Buzzanca 
Jerry Calà 
Carlo Campanini 
Enzo Cannavale 
Maccio Capatonda 
Pino Caruso 
Massimo Ceccherini 
Adriano Celentano 
Athina Cenci 
Walter Chiari 
Cochi e Renato 
Paola Cortellesi 
Giobbe Covatta 
Maurizio Crozza 
Geppi Cucciari 
Gianfranco D'Angelo 
Carlo Dapporto 
Mauro Di Francesco 
Aldo Fabrizi
Gioele Dix 
Giorgio Faletti 
Fanfulla 
Antonello Fassari 
Ficarra e Picone 
Rosario Fiorello
Dario Fo
Franco Franchi
Pippo Franco 
Nino Frassica
Margherita Fumero 
Gigi e Andrea 
Aldo Giuffrè 
Ezio Greggio 
Beppe Grillo 
Gene Gnocchi 
I Gufi 
Leo Gullotta 
Caterina Guzzanti
Corrado Guzzanti
Sabina Guzzanti
Paolo Hendel 
Enzo Iacchetti 
Sabrina Impacciatore 
Ciccio Ingrassia
Enzo Jannacci 
Katia & Valeria 
Cinzia Leone 
Lillo & Greg 
Luciana Littizzetto
Andy Luotto 
Daniele Luttazzi
Erminio Macario 
Nino Manfredi
Teresa Mannino 
Simona Marchini 
Neri Marcorè  
Maurizio Mattioli 
Anna Mazzamauro 
Maurizio Micheli 
Paola Minaccioni
Sandra Mondaini  
Enrico Montesano
Francesco Mulé 
Tuccio Musumeci 
Alighiero Noschese 
Giorgio Panariello 
Paolo Panelli 
Francesco Paolantoni 
Ettore Petrolini
Raffaele Pisu 
Renato Pozzetto
Gigi Proietti 
Virginia Raffaele 
Renato Rascel 
Ric e Gian 
David Riondino 
Mario Riva 
Enzo Robutti 
Paolo Rossi 
Francesco Salvi 
Pippo Santonastaso 
Alessandro Siani 
Alberto Sordi
Nino Taranto 
Teo Teocoli 
Nino Terzo 
Ugo Tognazzi 
Totò
Trettré 
Massimo Troisi 
Fatima Trotta 
Bice Valori 
Carlo Verdone
Raimondo Vianello 
Paolo Villaggio
Checco Zalone

See also

 Culture of Italy
 List of comedians
 List of Italians

 
Lists of comedians
Comedians